The Global System of Trade Preferences among Developing Countries (G.S.T.P) is a preferential trade agreement, currently encompassing 42 members (“participants”), signed on 13 April 1988 with the aim of increasing trade between developing countries. It was negotiated within the framework of the United Nations Conference on Trade and Development (UNCTAD). The Agreement  entered into force on 19 April 1989 and was notified to the then General Agreement on Tariffs and Trade (GATT), predecessor of the World Trade Organization (WTO), on 25 September 1989. The 42 members of GSTP include as well 7 LDCs (Bangladesh, Benin, Guinea, Mozambique, Myanmar, Sudan, and Tanzania).

The Agreement was initiated by UNCTAD to promote trade among developing countries, thereby fostering economic growth and South-South cooperation and has its roots in the Group of 77, a coalition of 134 developing countries created in 1964 to increase their negotiating leverage and promote their economic interests. 

The GSTP was established in 1989 as a framework for preferential tariff reductions and other measures of cooperation, including "para-tariffs, non-tariff measures, direct trade measures including medium and long-term contracts and sectoral agreements", to stimulate trade between developing countries. Today, only preferential tariffs are covered by the agreement. 

Through the framework of the GSTP, its participants aim to promote economic growth and development by capitalizing on South-South trade. Institutionally, the Committee of Participants (COP) is the highest decision-making organ of the GSTP and has the mandate to oversee the operation of the Agreement. The UNCTAD Secretariat provides substantive and technical support to the operation of the GSTP Agreement. 

GSTP economies represented a market of US$14 trillion in 2018, having grown at an average of 10.3% since 2000, nearly twice the world average growth. These economies generated an import demand of some US$4 trillion in 2018, or 20% of total world imports.

History

Background 
The first efforts to implement a preferential trading system at the plurilateral level that would encompass developing countries started in the mid-60s. In fact, following the establishment of the GATT Committee of Trade and Development in 1965, the Group on Expansion of Trade among Developing Countries was set up to analyze the dynamics behind trade among developing countries. In 1967, the first meeting of the Trade Negotiations Committee of Developing Countries in GATT was held. The Committee aim was to collect list of exports and concessions from developing countries in order to reach a common ground. 

In 1971 a Protocol on Trade Negotiations among Developing Countries (PTN)  was  agreed under the auspices of the Trade Negotiations Committee of Developing Countries and signed by 16 countries (Brazil, Chile, Egypt, Greece, India, Israel, Korea, Pakistan, Peru, Spain, Tunisia, Türkiye, Uruguay, Yugoslavia, Mexico and the Philippines), entering into force in 1973. As stated in the Protocol, the countries “agreed that the establishment of preferences among developing countries, appropriately administered and subject to the necessary safeguards, could make an important contribution to the trade among developing countries, and that such arrangements should be looked at in a constructive and forward-looking spirit”. The protocol covered 740 tariff positions, of whom one third covered agricultural products and raw materials. 

In parallel, the Group of 77 was working to promote the change necessary to realise the conditions that would foster economic development for developing countries. During the 1976 Mexico City Conference on Economic Co-operation among Developing Countries, a detailed programme on economic co-operation was compiled. The programme covered trade extensively and provided the conceptual basis for the GSTP. In fact, section XV. “Trade among developing countries” expressly mentioned the intention to “review all tariff and non-tariff problems relating to development of trade among developing countries” and “establish a system of trade preferences among developing countries at the subregional, regional, and interregional levels. Such a system should not allow the extension to developed countries of preferences granted to developing countries”. The programme would be endorsed during the Fourth Ministerial Meeting of the Group of 77 in Arusha in 1979 and developed further in Caracas in 1981.

Negotiations
In 1982, Ministers of Foreign Affairs belonging to the Group of 77 met in New York and defined the main components of the Agreement, establishing the negotiations framework as well. The Group of 77 began preparatory work in Geneva in 1984 with Ministerial impetus provided in 1985 through the New Delhi Ministerial Meeting. 

It is during the Ministerial Meeting in Brasilia in 1986 that the GSTP was established as a provisional legal framework. The negotiations on the text of the Agreement were to be completed two years after in Belgrade, jointly with the first round of tariff reduction negotiations. 

In April 1989, when the Agreement entered into force, the schedules of tariff concessions covered more than 1800 tariff items. These number was reduced to less than 1000 after the dissolution on Yugoslavia and the withdrawal of Romania from the Agreement.

The São Paulo Round
In 2004, GSTP participants decided to start new negotiations. A Third Round of Trade Negotiations was launched on the occasion of UNCTAD XI in São Paulo, Brazil. This round of negotiations is called the São Paulo Round. Under the authority of the GSTP Negotiating Committee, the 22 participants (Argentina, Brazil, Paraguay, and Uruguay (forming Mercosur), Algeria, Chile, Cuba, Democratic People’s Republic of Korea, Egypt, India, Indonesia, Iran, Malaysia, Mexico, Morocco, Nigeria, Pakistan, Republic of Korea, Sri Lanka, Thailand, Vietnam and Zimbabwe) aimed at broadening and deepening tariff concessions. 

During the negotiations, ministerial guidance was provided in April 2008 on the occasion of UNCTAD XII, in Accra, Ghana. Subsequently, meeting in December 2009 in Geneva, Ministers approved the parameters (“modalities”) for exchanging tariff concessions. The Ministerial Decision on Modalities of 2 December 2009 included, in par. 7, “(a) an across-the-board, line-by-line, linear cut of at least 20 per cent on at least 70 per cent of their dutiable tariff lines; or (b) in the case of Participants with duty-free tariff lines accounting for more than 50 per cent of their total national tariff lines an across-the-board, line-by-line, linear cut of at least 20 per cent on at least 60 per cent of their dutiable tariff lines; and (c) the proposed schedule of tariff concessions shall be presented in the same format as the schedules annexed to this Protocol.” The modalities provided for differential and more favorable treatment within the market access modalities. 

After six years of negotiations, the Round was concluded on 15-16 December 2010 at a Ministerial Meeting in Foz do Iguaçu, Brazil, where 8 participants (counting Mercosur as one) exchanged tariff concessions and adopted the São Paulo Round Protocol. These are: Argentina, Brazil, Paraguay and Uruguay (forming Mercosur), the Republic of Korea, India, Indonesia, Malaysia, Egypt, Morocco and Cuba.

Implementation

Under paragraph 10 (c) of the Protocol, the results of the São Paulo Round will enter into force with the ratification of at least four countries. Currently, Argentina (2018), Brazil (2022), Cuba (2013), India (2010), Malaysia (2011) and Uruguay (2017) ratified the Agreement. However, ratification by all four members of Mercosur is required for the Protocol to be deemed to have been ratified by Mercosur as a group, as the group maintains a single schedule of tariff concessions as a customs union with common external tariffs. Pending one more ratification, the São Paulo Round results remain to be implemented.

Membership

GSP Membership and São Paulo Round participants

Former members: Yugoslavia (from 1989-04-19 until dissolution), Romania (from 1989-04-19 until its EU membership), Colombia (from 1989-04-19 until 2017).

Implications for South-South trade
South-South trade represents an important untapped potential for developing countries. The reasons lie in its growth in terms of value – the total South-South trade was US$600 billion in 1995 and it hit US$5.3 trillion in 2021  - and its overall volume – trade volume between developing countries is now higher than the one between developing and developed countries. 

GSTP participants represent significant markets as well. Collectively, the 43 GSTP economies (including Colombia)  represented a market of US$14 trillion in 2018, having grown at 10.3 per cent since 2000s, nearly twice the world average growth. In addition, these economies generated an import demand of some US$4 trillion in 2018, or 20 per cent of total world imports. In addition, it provides opportunities for diversification and resilience. Research shows that South-South trade tends to foster non-traditional exports, including agro-industrial products and higher value-added and technology intensive manufactured goods, and makes it easier for firms to move up the value chain. 

The GSTP represents an important step further towards stronger South-South trade integration and cooperation. In particular, the São Paulo Round provided a major impulse to South-South trade. Current signatories have a combined population of over 2 billion.  In terms of the Agreement, while previous rounds of 1992 and 1998 covered some 650 tariff lines, the São Paulo Round is set to cover over 47,000. 

A preliminary model-based estimates by UNCTAD find that the São Paulo Round outputs will have a significant positive welfare effect. In fact, estimates suggest that implementation of the São Paulo Round by all eleven of its current signatories will result in shared welfare gains of US$14 billion.

See also 
Market access
Tariffs
United Nations Conference on Trade and Development
Group of 77
South-South Cooperation

References

External links 
 United Nations Conference on Trade and Development website on the GSTP	
 Agreement on the Global System of Trade Preferences among Developing Countries (1988) - UNCTAD Website	
 Agreement on the Global System of trade Preferencies (GSTP), integral text - UN website
 São Paulo Round of the Global System of Trade Preferences Among Developing Countries - Ministerial Decision on Modalities- SPR/NC/MM/1 - of 2 December 2009 - UNCTAD Website 
São Paulo Round Protocol to the Agreement on the Global System Of Trade Preferences Among Developing Countries - SPR/NC/FOZ/3 - 15 December 2010 - UNCTAD Website
 Sri Lanka Department of Commerce GSTP webpage
 Brazil Ministério das Relações Exteriores GSTP webpage
 India Ministry of Commerce and Industry GSTP webpage
 Rules of Origin Facilitator for GSTP
 Energizing South-South Trade: The Global System of Trade Preferences Among Developing Countries (2019)	
 WTO page for GSTP

Economic geography
International development treaties